A widescreen aspect ratio was first seen in a movie in Paramount's Old Ironsides of 1926. A few years later in 1928 and '29, a fad broke out for such special features as widescreen and color. Color was the more common choice, being that it was projected the same as black and white while theaters needed wider screens and special lenses for their projectors to show widescreen movies. With the lack of a standard for widescreen aspect ratios, studios had to go to the expense of filming several versions of a widescreen movie to cover the more common kinds of projector lens. The first movie to combine the two was Fox Movietone Follies of 1929, widescreen and partially in color. The next year, there were two, Song of the Flame and Kismet, which are today both lost films. By late 1930, however, most of the planned widescreen movies were shelved as studios began to feel the effects of The Great Depression and were forced to economize.

In 1953, 20th Century Fox returned to the concept and began using the CinemaScope process to make widescreen movies, such as How to Marry a Millionaire. Widescreen grew in popularity during the 1950s, and since 1960, nearly every American feature film has been widescreen.

List
BW stands for black and white.

See also
 List of early color feature films
 Cinerama

History of film